Steven H. Zeisel is a Kenan Distinguished University Professor in Nutrition and Pediatrics; former Chairman, Department of Nutrition; Director Nutrition Research Institute, Director UNC Human Clinical Nutrition Research Center, Director UNC Center for Excellence in Children’s Nutrition, School of Public Health, University of North Carolina at Chapel Hill.

Background
Zeisel is the Kenan Distinguished University Professor in the Department of Nutrition in the Gillings School of Global Public Health at the University of North Carolina at Chapel Hill.  He is also the Director of the UNC’s Nutrition Research Institute at the newly formed North Carolina Research Campus in Kannapolis, North Carolina and the UNC Nutrition Obesity Research Center. He served as chair of the Department of Nutrition at the University of North Carolina at Chapel Hill from 1990-2005. He is currently a member of the American Society for Nutrition,  the American Society for Parenteral and Enteral Nutrition, the American College of Nutrition and the Society for Pediatric Research, among others.

He has served on the Annual Review of Nutrition’s editorial committee and continues to serve on the FASEB Journal editorial board. Zeisel is a member of the World Cancer Research Fund’s Expert Panel on “Food, Nutrition and the Prevention of Cancer: a global perspective.” He serves as the principal investigator on multiple federally funded research projects that focus on human requirements for choline and the effects of this nutrient on brain development. He has authored more than 280 scientific publications. Zeisel earned his M.D. from Harvard Medical School in 1975, was a resident in pediatrics at Yale University from 1975–1977, and earned his Ph.D. in nutrition at the Massachusetts Institute of Technology in 1980.

Publications

Year of birth missing (living people)
Living people
University of North Carolina at Chapel Hill faculty
Harvard Medical School alumni
Massachusetts Institute of Technology alumni